Milia (literally 'Apple tree', is a village in the Famagusta District of Cyprus. It is under the de facto control of Northern Cyprus.

References

Communities in Famagusta District
Populated places in Gazimağusa District